Geoffrey Maddock is a New Zealand musician, songwriter, record producer and composer. He was a member of the rock group Bressa Creeting Cake and was a significant creative force in pop band Goldenhorse.

References

New Zealand musicians
Year of birth missing (living people)
Living people
Place of birth missing (living people)